The 14th edition of the Strade Bianche was held on 1 August 2020. Starting and finishing in Siena, Italy, it was the sixth event of the 2020 UCI World Tour. The race was originally scheduled for 7 March 2020 but was postponed to 1 August 2020 due to the COVID-19 pandemic. After finishing third in the past two editions of the race, Belgian Wout van Aert of  won the race in just under five hours after going solo with around 13 kilometers to go.

Teams
Twenty-four teams, including 18 of the 19 UCI WorldTeams and six UCI Professional Continental teams. All but two teams entered seven riders;  and  only entered six riders. Of the 166 riders that started the race, only 42 finished, while a further 8 riders finished over the time limit.

UCI WorldTeams

 
 
 
 
 
 
 
 
 
 
 
 
 
 
 
 
 
 

UCI Professional Continental teams

Result

References

External links
 

Strade Bianche
Strade Bianche
Strade Bianche
Strade Bianche
Strade Bianchi